Raghavendra Singh is  an Indian politician.  He was elected to the Lok Sabha, the lower house of the Parliament of India from the Unnao constituency of Uttar Pradesh as a member of the Janata Party.

References

External links
Official Biographical Sketch in Lok Sabha Website

Janata Party politicians
1933 births
Possibly living people